Nannion (circa 350 BC) was a Greek hetaira.  

She was the daughter of the hetaira Korone and the granddaughter of the hetaira Nannion the Elder.  She is likely the same hetaira who is often referred to as Nannarion from that period.  Nannion is mentioned in the speech Against Patrokles by Hyperides, as well as by Antiphanes, Amphis and Anaxilas. She was the subject of several Attic plays, among them Eubolos Nannion.

References

4th-century BC Greek women
Hetairai